Valeriy Myronovych Horbatov is a Ukrainian politician and scientist.

References

External links
 Valeriy Horbatov at Who is who in Crimea
 Valeriy Horbatov

1955 births
Living people
People from Mykolaiv Oblast
Recipients of the Order of Merit (Ukraine), 2nd class
Recipients of the Order of Merit (Ukraine), 3rd class
Recipients of the Order of the Red Banner of Labour
Social Democratic Party of Ukraine (united) politicians
Labour Ukraine politicians
Second convocation members of the Verkhovna Rada
Third convocation members of the Verkhovna Rada
Fourth convocation members of the Verkhovna Rada
Presidential representatives of Ukraine in Crimea
Prime Ministers of Crimea